Akeem Dent (born September 24, 1987) is a former American football linebacker. He was drafted by the Atlanta Falcons in the third round of the 2011 NFL Draft. He played college football at Georgia. He played for the Atlanta Falcons and Houston Texans.

Professional career

Atlanta Falcons
Dent was selected by the Atlanta Falcons in the third round (91st pick overall) of the 2011 NFL Draft. He was signed by the team on July 28. Dent was selected to the Pro Football Weekly All-Rookie Team.

Houston Texans
On June 18, 2014, Dent was traded to the Houston Texans for quarterback T. J. Yates.

Dent signed a two-year contract to stay with the Texans on March 24, 2015.

Jacksonville Jaguars
On August 28, 2017, Dent signed with the Jacksonville Jaguars, only to be released on September 1.

NFL career statistics

Coaching career

Houston Texans
On February 5, 2019, Dent was hired as a defensive assistant for the Houston Texans of the National Football League (NFL).

Green Bay Packers
On May 11, 2022, Dent was announced as a member of the Green Bay Packers Bill Walsh Diversity Coaching Fellowship program.

References

External links
 Houston Texans bio
 Atlanta Falcons bio
 Georgia Bulldogs bio

1987 births
Living people
American football linebackers
Atlanta Falcons players
Georgia Bulldogs football players
Houston Texans coaches
Houston Texans players
Jacksonville Jaguars players
Players of American football from Atlanta